Nahuel Ezequiel Gallardo (born 9 May 1998) is an Argentine professional footballer who plays as a left-back for Once Caldas, on loan from River Plate.

Career
Gallardo started off in the youth of River Plate. He was promoted into the senior squad in October 2017 for an Argentine Primera División match with Talleres, he played the full ninety minutes of a 4–0 defeat at the Estadio Mario Alberto Kempes; with his father, Marcelo, as manager of River Plate.

Personal life
Gallardo is the son of manager and former footballer Marcelo Gallardo.

Career statistics
.

References

External links

1998 births
Living people
Argentine footballers
Argentine expatriate footballers
Footballers from Buenos Aires
Association football defenders
Argentine Primera División players
Categoría Primera A players
Club Atlético River Plate footballers
Defensa y Justicia footballers
Club Atlético Colón footballers
Once Caldas footballers
Argentine expatriate sportspeople in Colombia
Expatriate footballers in Colombia